Karin Albihn (6 October 1912 – 4 September 1974) was a Swedish film and stage actress. She appeared in fourteen films in a mixture of leading and supporting roles. She was given a screen test in Berlin as the Nazi era German film industry attempted to find stars to replace the departed Marlene Dietrich, although this ultimately came to nothing.

Selected filmography
 False Greta (1934)
 Conscientious Objector Adolf (1936)
 The Wedding Trip (1936)
 The Andersson Family (1937)
 The Pale Count (1937)
 Just a Bugler (1938)
 Styrman Karlssons flammor (1938)

References

Bibliography
 Carter, Erica. Dietrich's Ghosts: The Sublime and the Beautiful in Third Reich Film. Bloomsbury Publishing, 2019.
 Rentschler, Eric. The Ministry of Illusion: Nazi Cinema and Its Afterlife. Harvard University Press, 1996.

External links

1912 births
1974 deaths
Swedish stage actresses
Swedish film actresses
20th-century Swedish actresses
Actresses from Stockholm